The following is a list of the 70 municipalities (comuni) of the Metropolitan City of Cagliari, Sardinia, Italy.

List

See also 
List of municipalities of Italy

References 

Cagliari